The 2017 Monza GP3 Series round was the sixth round of the 2017 GP3 Series. It was held on 2 and 3 September 2017 at Autodromo Nazionale Monza in Monza, Italy. The race supported the 2017 Italian Grand Prix.

Heavy rain forced the rescheduling of race 1 to the original spot of race 2, leaving no time for race 2 to take place.

Classification

Qualifying 

 Heavy rains forced the cancellation of qualifying. Nirei Fukuzumi was credited with pole position as he had set the fastest lap time during free practice.

Feature race 
{| class="wikitable" style="font-size:85%"
!
!
!Driver
!Team
!Laps
!Time/Gap
!Grid
!Points
|-
!1
| align="center" |3
| George Russell
|ART Grand Prix
|21
|44:15.898
|2
| align="center" |25
|-
!2
| align="center" |1
| Jack Aitken
|ART Grand Prix
|21
| +1.526
|4
|align="center" |18
|-
!3
| align="center" |4
| Anthoine Hubert
|ART Grand Prix
|21
| +2.361
|3
| align="center" |15 (2)
|-
!4
| align="center" |28
| Marcos Siebert
|Campos Racing
|21
| +2.959
|11
|align="center" |12
|-
!5
| align="center" |11
| Ryan Tveter
|Trident
|21
| +5.026
|17
| align="center" |10
|-
!6
| align="center" |10
| Giuliano Alesi
|Trident
|21
| +5.351
|13
| align="center" |8
|-
!7
| align="center" |15
| Tatiana Calderon
|DAMS
|21
| +6.448
|19
| align="center" |6
|-
!8
| align="center" |26
| Julien Falchero
|Campos Racing
|21
| +7.044
|18
| align="center" |4
|-
!9
| align="center" |9
| Kevin Jörg
|Trident
|21
| +7.207
|20
| align="center" |2
|-
!10
| align="center" |16
| Bruno Baptista
|DAMS
|21
| +8.879
|16
| align="center" |1
|-
!11
| align="center" |27
| Raoul Hyman
|Campos Racing
|21
| +9.567
|15
|
|-
!12
| align="center" |7
| Steijn Schothorst
|Arden International
|21
| +9.645
|6
|
|-
!13
| align="center" |14
| Dan Ticktum
|DAMS
|21
| +16.268
|10
|
|-
!14
| align="center" |12
| Dorian Boccolacci
|Trident
|21
| +40.836
|5
|
|-
!DNF
| align="center" |5
| Niko Kari
|Arden International
|19
|Crash
|14
|
|-
!DNF
| align="center" |24
| Arjun Maini
|Jenzer Motorsport
|18
|Rear wing Damage 
|8
|
|-
!Ret
| align="center" |23
| Juan Manuel Correa
|Jenzer Motorsport
|12
|Crash
|12
|
|-
!Ret
| align="center" |6
| Leonardo Pulcini
|Arden International
|0
|Collision
|7
|
|-
!Ret
| align="center" |22
| Alessio Lorandi
|Jenzer Motorsport
|0
|Collision 
|9
|
|-
!DNS
| align="center" |2
| Nirei Fukuzumi
|ART Grand Prix
|0
|Did not start
|1
|align="center" |(4)
|-
! colspan="8" |''Fastest lap:  Anthoine Hubert − ART Grand Prix − 1:40.232 (lap 11)''
|-
! colspan="8" |Source:
|}

Championship standings after the round

Drivers' Championship standings

Teams' Championship standings

 Note: Only the top five positions are included for both sets of standings.

References

|- style="text-align:center"
|width="35%"|Previous race:|width="30%"|GP3 Series2017 season|width="40%"|Next race:'''

Monza
GP3
GP3 Monza